Harry Woods may refer to:

 Harry M. Woods (1896–1970), musician and songwriter
 Harry Woods (actor) (1889–1968), American actor
 Harry Woods (footballer) (1894–?), English footballer
 Harry Woods (Illinois politician) (1863–1914), American politician
 Harry Woods (Australian politician) (born 1947), Australian politician
 Harry Woods (rugby league), English rugby league footballer of the 1930s
 Harry Woods (rugby union) (1903–1972), Australian rugby union player

See also
 Harry Wood (disambiguation)
 Henry Woods (disambiguation)